Crime in Finland is combated by the Finnish police and other agencies.

Crime by type

Murder 

In 2021, Finland had a total of 105 homicides + 23 negligent homicides.

Half of murders involve men of specific groups (unemployed, undereducated, drug and alcohol problems) in heavy drinking situations. Thirty-five percent of homicides are committed by family members, and ten percent of homicides are classified as youth violence.

Women constitute 10 percent of offenders and 25 percent of victims. The vast majority of female offenders target a husband or other family member. Twenty-three percent of homicide victims of male offenders were strangers. Fewer than 20 percent of murders are committed outdoors.

Firearms are used in 14 percent of the cases. Street shootings and gang violence are extremely rare. A few cases involving motorcycle gangs have occurred in recent years, attracting national attention.

Sexual violence 
In 2018, 1393 cases of rape were reported to the police. According to official statistics , 27.0% of rapes have been committed by foreigners in Finland, who comprise 2.2%  of population. In contrast, the rape support helpline Tukinainen reports that 6% of all callers and 11% of 10–20-year-old callers say that the rapist was a foreigner. Finnish rapists are more likely to be known personally by the victim, increasing the threshold to report . Furthermore, there are great asymmetries between nationalities of rapists.

Financial crime
Finland has been known to give low sentences for financial crimes such as cartel behaviour, insider trading, and tax evasion. The sentences are especially low when compared with the potential benefits of committing such crimes, as well as when compared with international standards. An example of the difference between sentence and benefits is the case of Lemminkäinen in 2006. Lemminkäinen was hit with a €68,000,000 fine for cartel. This was markedly lower than the estimated €400,000,000 Lemminkäinen would have made if receiving just 20% of the criminal profit. Executives were not sentenced to prison or fined for their involvement.

Examples of cartels in Finland include: Metsäliitto and Stora Enso who were sentenced €500,000 and Elisa which was sentenced €4,160,000 in 2001. The European Union has given much higher sanctions for cartels, as seen in the cases of UPM-Kymmene (€56,000,000), Outokumpu (€36,000,000), and Kemira (€33,000,000).

Fraud and embezzlment also occur. For example the scandal over IT supplies in schools in Helsinki

Corruption

Political corruption levels are extremely low and previously Finland was annually named the least corrupted country for years. The number of notices of corruption related crimes were lower than the murder rate in 2007—there were about 15 reports of bribery or attempted bribery annually. In 2006, there were 115 reports of corruption. One-fourth of these involved seeking private gain. One-third of the cases were attempts to harm someone rather than seek gain. Between 2002 and 2007, no corporations were fined and no business prohibitions were imposed for committing bribery.

A campaign funding controversy that began in 2008 has eroded the confidence in the transparency of Finnish politics. Finland's Transparency International's Corruption Perceptions Index ranking has dropped to 5th place. The continuing controversy began with a remark by a Centre Party MP that he had not disclosed his funding sources because, despite the obligation, there was no punishment for avoiding it coded in the law. Later it was found a group of property developers had supported certain MPs of the three major parties (Centre Party, National Coalition and Social Democratic Party) allegedly to produce favorable zoning decisions.

Furthermore, MPs of the government-leading Centre Party had funneled public funds to party-associated foundations that had subsequently funded the personal campaigns of Centre Party politicians, including Prime Minister Matti Vanhanen. There are criminal investigations ongoing by the National Bureau of Investigation. Incomplete disclosure of funding sources was the problem of the two other major parties.

Organised crime
The Finnish National Bureau of Investigation is aware of the existence of approximately ninety criminal gangs with a total membership of around eight-hundred. There are several competing motorcycle gangs in Finland. A historic rivalry between the Hells Angels and Bandidos erupted in the Nordic Biker War in the 1990s. Other international biker gangs operating in the country include the Diablos, Outlaws, Red Devils and Satudarah, as well as Cannonball, a prominent domestic organisation.

Along with these motorcycle gangs, there are other criminal organisations without the same principles as in biker groups such as Bats, United Brotherhood and X-Team, a Bandidos sub-division. United Brotherhood, a merger of the former Natural Born Killers, Rogues Gallery and M.O.R.E. gangs, utilizes the drug trade, financial crimes and security services as sources of income. In 2013, the police raided a suspected United Brotherhood member's home and found 47 firearms, 18 of which were capable of sustained rapid fire, along with drugs, doping substances and jewellery.  In 2018, 30 weapons including sub-machine guns were seized from the same group. In 2019, a crackdown saw these gangs and any related clothing or symbols banned.

Street gangs

A recent phenomenon affecting some major cities.

Crime dynamics

Guns

Finland is an average European country in the terms of gun ownership, with about 1.5 million guns in register and 30 guns for every 100 people. A bulk of this number consists of hunting weapons and there are only 220 000 pistols and revolvers on the register.  A persistent myth claims that Finns would have the fourth most firearms in the world per capita (right after United States, Yemen, Switzerland), with around 45.3 guns for every 100 people. This false number rises from the Small Arms Survey, which claimed in 2007 that there would be 800 000 unregistered guns in addition to the registered ones. This claim has been since refuted and has no basis in reality according to the Finnish officials, who estimate the amount of illegal guns to be "in thousands", with a significant amount of them being over 80 years old war trophies. Also, Finland registers OC sprays and other spray-based weapons with a gun license, adding to the gun ownership total. Many other European countries, such as Germany, do not require a license to carry an OC spray in public. Finland has a high incidence of gun related deaths including suicides, but in gun-related homicides, it is the fifth-ranking country in the EU.

Guns and other weapons are tightly regulated. One must separately apply for a gun license, which cannot be issued for "self defense reasons". Even other weapons, such as pepper sprays, are regulated. Carrying weapons, including guns and knives in public is not allowed . "police have received about 230 reports annually of theft or aggravated theft involving firearms"

Alcohol and criminality
The majority of criminals and victims of violent crime are under the influence of alcohol during the act. Statistics show that in homicides 61 to 75 percent, in attempted homicides 71 to 78 percent and in assaults 71 to 73 percent of the offenders have been under the influence of alcohol. During the last two decades the number of drunk offenders has increased. Roughly half of the crimes of theft involve the use of alcohol.

Drugs

The Finnish drug market is stable, with cannabis type drugs most commonly used and seized by law enforcement agencies, while amphetamines, MDMA/ecstasy and other synthetic psychoactive substances and narcotic pharmaceuticals remain important. There is very low heroin use. Opioids are a significant part of the addiction market. There is a large amount of smuggling of snuff called snus from Sweden.

Around 6000 individuals have been identified in 2019 for buying goods from a dark web supplier, most probably drugs

Statistics

(1) From 1999 onwards, offences against the Penal code contain offences previously recorded under the Road Traffic Act.
(2) In the Penal Code as of 1994
(3) Traffic offences
(4) line across a time series shows substantial breaks in the homogeneity of a series
(5) Population of Finland by the end of year 2004 was 5,237,000
(6) these statistics are from official statistics Finland database, but the numbers do not add up, so some data is missing.

Punishment
The most common punishments are fines and probation. Community service is also a punishment. These are generally effective in preventing a repetition of an offence. The day fine system is in effect; this means, that if an offence warrants fines, they are calculated in proportion to the offender's income when this is higher than the minimum fine.

Lengths of prison sentences have increased in recent years, though Finnish prison terms are exceptionally short in the international context. Drug trafficking and manslaughter result in the longest prison sentences, of 8–12 years (15 years if multiple crimes), after premeditated murder. Although life sentences are given for murder, probation is given after 10 years at the earliest if the offender was under 21 years of age, otherwise 12 years is the minimum. People under 18 years cannot be sentenced to life sentence, but the maximum sentence is 15 years. There is also possibility of presidential amnesty at any time. Therefore, effective life sentences are enforced in only cases of involuntary commitment of murderers.

The last time capital punishment was enforced in peacetime was in 1825 (see: Tahvo Putkonen). In the Finnish Civil War (1918) and in the 3 wars of World War II (1939–1945): Winter War, Continuation War and Lapland War capital punishment was enforced e.g. Arndt Pekurinen. The death penalty was abolished in 1971.

Finland is generally quite soft on crimes. For example Reijo Hammar although convicted of murder was pardoned by the president despite serving less than 10 years, and after that able to get a gun and threatened to kill. The punishment was a fine which amounted to about an average week's wages. Other murderers get life sentences for murder of effectively a decade due to paroling.

Rate of incarceration
The average number of prisoners was 2 800 during 2020.

Policing

Finland has 130 police officers per 100,000 people. The United States has 298 per 100,000 and Germany has 372. In 2021, police officers accounted for 7 450 of the total police personnel.

References

Other sources
Number of police officers
Alcohol and criminality in Finland (in Finnish) PDF
Number of firearms in Finland (in Finnish)
Comparison of homicides in Finland and Ireland (in Finnish)
Statistics by the criminal sanctions agency
Findicator - Homicides (in Finnish)

External links
 Finnish crime statistics (NationsMaster.com)
 Statistics Finland, Justice and crime statistics
 Findicator - Offences against the Penal Code
 Findicator - Violent crime